Inside is a 1996 cable television film directed by Arthur Penn based on a script by Bima Stagg. It was the Penn's final film before dying in 2010. The film was shot in Johannesburg, South Africa and premiered in the USA on Showtime on 25 August 1996. The film was then released theatrically in several markets and played at several film festivals around the world including Cannes, Toronto, San Francisco and Munich. The film was nominated for an Emmy, and a Cable Ace Award.

Plot

Colonel Kruger (Nigel Hawthorne) tortures a political prisoner (Eric Stoltz) to learn who his anti-apartheid collaborators are. Ten years later, this same Colonel himself becomes a prisoner and is interrogated about his own offenses.

Cast
 Nigel Hawthorne as Colonel Hendrick Kruger
 Eric Stoltz as Peter Martin "Marty" Strydom
 Louis Gossett Jr. as Questioner

References

External links 

Films directed by Arthur Penn
1996 television films
1996 films
Films shot in Gauteng